Paul Robert Soles (August 11, 1930 – May 26, 2021) was a Canadian actor and television personality. He led the voice cast in such series as The Marvel Super Heroes (1966), voiced the title character in Spider-Man (1967), and portrayed Hermey in the 1964 television special Rudolph the Red-Nosed Reindeer; Soles was one of the last surviving participants of the special's voice cast.

Soles first screen appearance was on CFPL in 1953, and he continued to perform over 60 years later, performing as of 2016 in the comedy web series My 90-Year-Old Roommate on the Canadian Broadcasting Corporation's online comedy channel, CBC Comedy.

Career

Acting roles
Soles was the voice of Hermey the misfit elf in Rankin/Bass' Rudolph the Red-Nosed Reindeer from 1964. He also voiced Marvel superhero Spider-Man in the original animated television series also from the 1960s, and he played "The Lawbreaker" on the CBC panel quiz show This Is the Law in the 1970s, and played Costas Stavros on the Canadian soap opera Riverdale. In 2001, Soles took over the role of Shylock the Jew in the Stratford Festival of Canada production of The Merchant of Venice after Al Waxman, who was originally scheduled to play the part, died. Soles played Stanley the pizza shop owner in The Incredible Hulk (2008), and his other film appearances have included roles in Ticket to Heaven (1981), Just the Way You Are (1984) and The Gunrunner (1989) opposite Kevin Costner. He also played Danny, the Montreal Customs House janitor in the 2001 crime thriller The Score.

Soles won a 2006 Gemini Award for his role in the television series Terminal City, and a 2017 Canadian Screen Award for Best Performance by an Actor in a Digital Production for My 90-Year-Old Roommate.

Voice work
Soles also did voices on various animated television shows and films such as Rudolph the Red-Nosed Reindeer, Rocket Robin Hood, The Smokey Bear Show, The Little Brown Burro, King of the Beasts, The Marvel Super Heroes, the original Spider-Man cartoon, The Trolls and the Christmas Express, Take Me Up to the Ball Game, Willy McBean and His Magic Machine, Festival of Family Classics, JoJo's Circus, The Reluctant Dragon & Mr. Toad Show, Noah's Animals, Iron Man, The King Kong Show, and Spider-Woman.

Soles was also the narrator of The Wonderful Stories of Professor Kitzel, the voice of The Commissioner in the 2005 animated television series Funpak and has also supplied the voice of Dr. Reboux in the 2005 animated film version of the Johanna Spyri novel Heidi.

Soles also voiced the Academy Award-nominated animated documentary The Colours of My Father: A Portrait of Sam Borenstein.

In 2011, Soles started voicing the recurring character Maxwell Finnwich on Detentionaire and he voiced a character, Barnabas Dinklelot, in the 2017-2018 animated series, Mysticons.

Television hosting
He was the host of the short-lived CBC Television late-night comedy talk show Canada After Dark, and co-hosted the public affairs show Take 30 for 18 seasons with hosts such as Anna Cameron and Adrienne Clarkson. He also hosted the CFPL television game show Take Your Choice for one year in the early 1960s.

Documentary producer
Paul Soles was also a producer of documentaries while he was an on-air talent at CFPL-TV in London, Ontario. He worked on a series called, The World Around Us, and travelled with film crews in Great Britain in the early 1960s, filming many aspects of British life. He even got on a soap-box in Hyde Park in London to speak his mind. Soles has worked with people like Dennis Goulden (a long-time documentarian who still produces television specials in the States) and Jim Plant and Tom Ashwell and Jon Boynton.

Personal life
Soles was born in Toronto, the son of Lillian (Goodfellow) and Arthur L. Soles. His family were Jewish emigrants from Poland and Lithuania. He had two siblings. Soles is cousin of Bernard "Bunny" Cowan, and they both worked on the original 1960s Spider-Man animated series and the 1967 children's series Max, the 2000-Year-Old Mouse.

Death
Soles died in Toronto, Ontario, Canada on May 26, 2021, at the age of 90.

Filmography

Film

Television

References

External links

Entry at thecanadianencyclopedia.ca

1930 births
2021 deaths
20th-century Canadian male actors
21st-century Canadian male actors
Best Supporting Actor in a Drama Series Canadian Screen Award winners
Canadian male soap opera actors
Canadian male stage actors
Canadian male voice actors
Canadian people of Lithuanian-Jewish descent
Canadian people of Polish-Jewish descent
Canadian television talk show hosts
Jewish Canadian male actors
Male actors from Toronto